This is a list of forts in India.

Andhra Pradesh

Coastal Region 

 Anvika Fort
 Addanki Fort - Prakasam district
 Bellamkonda Fort - Guntur district
 Bobbili Fort – Vizianagaram district
 Dharanikota Fort – Guntur district
 Durgam Fort – Prakasam district (Kanigiri)
 Gajanan Fort – Visakhapatnam district
 Gonthina Fort – Visakhapatnam district
 Kondapalli Fort – Krishna district
 Kondaveedu Fort – Guntur district
 Machilipatnam Fort (16th century Dutch Fort) – Krishna district
 Mogalturu Fort - West Godavari district
 Nagarjunakonda Fort - Guntur district
 Parth Fort
 Udayagiri Fort - Nellore district
 Venkatigiri Fort - Nellore district
 Vinukonda Fort - Guntur district
 Vizianagaram Fort – Vizianagaram district
 Yanamandala Fort – Guntur district

Rayalseema Region 

 Adoni Fort – Kurnool district
 Chandragiri Fort – Tirupati
 Chennampalli Fort – Kurnool district
 Devaraya Fort – Vijayanagaram district
 Gandikota Fort – Kadapa district
 Gooty Fort – Anantapur district
 Gurramkonda Fort – Chittoor district
 Konda Reddy Fort – Kurnool district
 Madakasira Fort – Sri Sathya Sai district
 Penukonda Fort – Anantapur district
 Ratnagiri Fort – Sri Sathya Sai district
 Siddavatam Fort – Kadapa district

Arunachal Pradesh 
 Ita Fort, Itanagar
 Bhismaknagar Fort, Roing
 Bolung Fort, Bolung
 Gomsi Fort, East Siang
 Rukmini Fort, Roing
 Tezu Fort, Roing
 Buroi Fort, Papum Pare

Assam 
 Garchuk Lachit Garh
 Garh Doul
 Kareng Ghar
 Matiabag Palace
 Talatal Ghar

Bihar 
 Buxar Fort
 Darbhanga Fort
 Jagdishpur Fort
 Jalalgarh Fort
 Munger Fort
 Rohtasgarh Fort
 Shergarh Fort

Chandigarh 
 Burail Fort
 Manimajra Fort

Chhattisgarh 
 Chaiturgarh Fort
 Jashpur
 Khairagarh
 Ratanpur Fort
 Surguja Palace

Dadra and Nagar Haveli and Daman and Diu 
 Diu Fort
 Fort St. Anthony of Simbor
 St. Jerome Fort of Daman
 Moti Daman Fort of Daman

Delhi 

 Rashtrapati Bhawan
 Adilabad Fort
Delhi Gate
 Feroz Shah Kotla
 Jahanpanah
 Najafgarh Fort
 Purana Qila
 Qila Rai Pithora
 Red Fort
 Salimgarh Fort
 Siri Fort
 Qila Lal Kot
 Tughlaqabad Fort

Goa 

 Aguada Fort
 Alorna Fort
 Anjediva Fort
 Betul Fort 
 Cabo de Rama
 Chandor Fort
 Chapora Fort
 Corjuem Fort
 Gandaulim Fort
 Gaspar Dias Fort
 Mormugão Fort
 Nanuz Fort
 Naroa Fort
 Palácio do Cabo
 Ponda Fort
 Rachol Fort
 Reis Magos
 Sanquelim Fort
 Fortaleza de São Sebastião
 São Tiago of Banastarim Fort
 São Tomé of Tivim Fort
 St Estevam Fort
 Tiracol Fort

Gujarat 

 Bhadra Fort, Ahmedabad
 Bhujia Fort, Bhuj, Jadeja Rajput's
 Kanthkot Fort, Bhachau, Occupied by Solanki and Chavda Rajput's
 Manek Burj, Ahmedabad
 Pavagadh, Chavda Rajput's
 Roha Fort, Bhuj, Some clan of Rajput's of Kutch
 Songadh Fort, Tapi district
 Surat Castle, Surat
 Tera Fort, Kutch, Jadeja Rajput's
 Uparkot Fort, Junagadh, Chudasama Rajput's
 Patan Fort, Patan, Solanki Rajput's
 Idar Fort, Idar, Rathore Rao Rajput's
 Bharuch Fort, Bharuch, Solanki Rajput's
 Dabhoi Fort, Dabhoi, Solanki Rajput's
 Indragad Fort, Palikarambeli
 Sachin Fort, Sachin
 Chhatrapati Shivaji Parnera Fort, Parnera Pardi
 Gaurav Fort
 Gaikwad Fort, Vyara
 Arjungad Fort, Vapi

Haryana 

 Ancient Fort (also called Safidon Fort)
 Asigarh Fort (also called Hansi Fort), Chauhan & Tomar Rajput's
 Badshahpur Fort
 Buria Fort
 Dhosi Hill Fort
 Farrukhnagar Fort
 Fatehabad Fort
 Firoz Shah Palace Complex
 Indor Fort
 Jind Fort
 Kaithal Fort
 Kotla Fort
 Loharu Fort, Shekhawat Rajput's
 Madhogarh Fort, Kachwaha Rajput's
 Mahendragarh Fort
 Maham Fort
 Nahar Singh Mahal
 Pinjore Fort
 Raipur Rani Fort, Chauhan Rajput's
 Sadhaura Fort
 Sirsa Fort in Sirsa
 Tosham Fort, Tomar & Chahan Rajput's
 Thanesar Fort

Himachal Pradesh 

 Arki Fort
 Beja Palace
 Jaitak Fort
 Kahlur Fort
 Kamlah Fort
 Kangra Fort
 Kunihar Fort
 Kutlehar Fort
 Mahlog Fort
 Nadaun Fort, Hamirpur

Jammu and Kashmir 

 Akhnoor Fort
 Bahu Fort
 Bhimgarh Fort
 Chiktan Fort
 Hari Parbat Fort
 Jasmergarh Fort
 Ramnagar Fort

Jharkhand 
 Palamu Fort
 Shahpur Fort
Bhangarh fort

Karnataka 

 Malliabad Fort
 Jaladurga
 Bahaddur Bandi Fort
 Kyadigera Fort
 Bidar Fort
 Basavakalyana Fort
 Bhalki Fort
 Manyakheta Fort
 Kittur Fort
 Parasgad Fort
 Belgaum Fort
 Saundatti Fort
 Ramdurg Fort
 Bailhongal Fort
 Hooli Fort
 Gokak Fort
 Shirasangi Fort
 Bijapur Fort
 Gajendrgad Fort
 Korlahalli Fort
 Hammigi Fort
 Hemagudda Fort
 Mundargi Fort
 Singatalur Fort
 Tippapura Fort
 Nargund Fort
 Magadi Fort
 Jamalabad Fort
 Barkur Fort
 Daria-Bahadurgad Fort
 Kapu Fort
 Havanur Fort
 Mirjan Fort
 Sadashivgad Fort
 Asnoti
 Sanduru Fort
 Bellary Fort
 Adoni Fort
 Koppal Fort
 Anegundi Fort
 Kampli Fort
 Irakalgada
 Gulbarga Fort
 Sedam Fort
 Shahpur Fort
 Aihole Fort
 Badami Fort
 Bankapura Fort
 Savanur Fort
 Chitradurga Fort
 Devanahalli Fort
 Vanadurga Fort
 Channagiri Fort
 Kavaledurga Fort
 Basavaraj durga fort
 Uchangidurga Fort
 Budikote|
 Fort Anjediva
 Gudibanda
 Wagingera Fort
 Bangalore Fort
 Bhimgad Fort
 Kammatadurga
 Pavagada
 Madikeri Fort
 Savandurga
 Makalidurga|
 Vanadurga
 Sanmudageri
 Vishalgad
 Nagara Fort
 Basavaraja Fort
 Rayadurg
 Huthridurga
 Ambajidurga|
 Manjarabad Fort
 Skandagiri
 Hosadurga
 Nagara Fort
 Sathyamangalam Fort
 Tekkalakote Fort
 Thirthahalli Fort
 Raichur Fort
 Yadgir Fort

Kerala 

 Anchuthengu Fort
 Bekal Fort
 Chandragiri Fort
 Cranganore Fort (also called Kodungallur Fort, Kottapuram Fort)
 East Fort
 Fort Emmanuel
 Fort Thomas
 Hosdurg Fort
 Nedumkotta, a city wall
 Palakkad Fort
 Pallipuram Fort
 St. Angelo Fort (also known as Kannur Fort or Kannur Kotta)
 Tellicherry Fort
 William Fort (also called Chettuva Fort)

Madhya Pradesh 

 Ater Fort, Bhind (Bhadoriya Rajput's)
 Rewa Fort
 Ahilya Fort
 Asirgarh Fort
 Baderi Fort
 Bajrangarh Fort
 Bandhavgarh Fort
 Burhanpur Fort
 Chanderi Fort
 Chandia Fort
 Ginnorgarh fort
 Datia Fort
 Dhar Fort
 Garh Kundar
 Gadpahra
 Gohad Fort
 Govindgarh Fort
 Gwalior Fort
  Gujari Mahal, Gwalior fort 
  Man Mandir, Gwalior fort
  Teli ka mandir, Gwalior fort 
  Sas bahu Mandir, Gwalior fort
 Garrauli Fort
 Hinglajgarh
 Kamakandla Fort
 Madan Mahal
 Mandsaur Fort
 Mandu fort complex
 Narwar Fort
 Orchha Fort complex
 Raisen fort
 Rampayli fort
 Sabalgarh Fort (Sabala Gurjar)
  Nabalsingh Khanderao Habeli, Sabalgarh Fort
  Sindhiakalin Bandh, Sabalgarh Fort
 Sheopur
 Sendhwa
 Vijayraghavgarh
 Utila Fort

Maharashtra 

 Achala Fort
 Agashi Fort
 Ahmednagar Fort
 Ahme
 Ahivant Fort
 Ajinkyatara
 Ajmera Fort
 Akola Fort
 Akluj Fort
 Alang Fort
 Ambolgad
 Anjaneri
 Anjanvel Fort
 Ankai Fort
 Antur Fort
 Arnala fort
 Asheri fort
 Asava fort
 Avchitgad
 Avandha Fort
 Bahadur Fort
 Bahula Fort
 Balapur Fort
 Ballarpur Fort
 Bankot fort
 Belapur Fort
 Bhagwantgad
 Bhairavgad
 Bhamer Dhule
 Bharatgad
 Bhaskargad/Basgad
 Bhavangad Fort/Bhondgad
 Bhorgiri fort
 Bhudargad Fort
 Bhupatgad Fort
 Bhushangad
 Birwadi fort
 Bishta Fort
 Bitangad
 Bombay Castle
 Castella de Aguada/Bandra Fort
 Chanda Fort
 Chandan Fort
 Chanderi fort, Badlapur
 Chandragad/Dhavalgad
 Chandwad fort
 Chauler Fort/Chaurgad
 Chavand fort
 Dategad
 Dativare fort
 Daulatabad Fort
 Dermal Fort
 Devgad fort
 Dhodap
 Dhunda fort Nashik District
 Dongri Fort
 Dronagiri Fort
 Durgabhandar
 Durgadi Fort
 Fatte gad
 Fort George
 Gagangad
 Galna
 Gambhirgad
 Gawilghur
 Ghangad
 Ghargad
 Ghodbunder Fort
 Ghosale gad
 Goa fort
 Gorakhgad
 Gowalkot
 Gunvantgad
 Hadsar
 Hargad
 Harihar fort
 Harishchandragad
 Hatgad
 Irshalgad
 Indori fort, Pune District
 Indrai fort, Nashik District
 Jaigad Fort, Ratnagiri District
 Jamgaon Fort
 Jamner Fort
 Jangali Jayagad Satara District
 Janjira fort, Raigad District
 Javlya fort
 Jivdhan
 Kalanandigad
 Kalavantin Durg
 Kaldurg Fort
 Kalyangad/ Nandgiri
 Kamalgad
 Kamandurg Fort
 Kandhar Fort
 Kanchana Fort
 Kanhera Fort (Chalisgaon)
 Kanhera Fort
 Kankrala
 Karha Fort
 Karnala Fort
 Kavnai fort
 Kelve Fort
 Kenjalgad
 Khanderi
 Kharda
 Kohoj Fort
 Kolaba Fort
 Koldher Fort
 Konkan Diva Fort 
 Korlai Fort
 Korigad Fort
 Kothaligad
 Kulang Fort
 Kunjargad
 Kurdugad
 Laling fort
 Lingana
 Lohagad
 Machindragad
 Machnur Fort
 Madangad Fort
 Madh Fort
 Mailagad Fort/Mahelagad (Buldhana)
 Mahim Fort
 Mahimangad
 Mahipalgad
 Mahipatgad
 Mahur Fort
 Mahuli
 Makrandgad
 Malanggad
 Malegaon fort
 Malhargad/Sonori Fort
 Manaranjan Fort
 Mandangad fort
 Mangad Fort/Fort Mangad
 Mangalgad/ Kangori fort
 Mangi-Tungi
 Manikgad ( Dist.-Chandrapur)
 Manikgad (Raigad)
 Manohargad-Mansantoshgad
 Markanda Fort
 Mazagon Fort
 Mohandar fort/ Shidka fort
 Mohangad
 Mora fort
 Morgiri Fort
 Mrugagad
 Mulher
 Naldurg Fort
 Nanded fort
 Nandoshi fort
 Narayangad
 Narnala
 Narsimhagad
 Nhavigad
 Nimgiri-Hanumantgad fort
 Nivati fort
 Pabargad
 Padargad
 Padmadurg
 Palgad
 Palashi Fort
 Pandavgad
 Panhala Fort
 Paranda Fort
 Pargadh
 Parola Fort
 Patta Fort
 Pavangad
 Pettah of Ahmednagar
 Pisola fort
 Prabalgad
 Prachitgad
 Pratapgad
 Purandar fort
 Purnagad
 Rangana Fort
 Raigad Fort
 Rajgad
 Rajdher fort
 Ramsej
 Ramtek
 Rasalgad
 Ratangad
 Ratnadurg
 Ravlya Fort
 Revdanda fort
 Riwa Fort
 Rohida fort
 Sagargad
 Sajjangad
 Salher
 Salota fort
 Samangad
 Sangram Durg
 Santoshgad
 Sarasgad
 Sarjekot fort
 Sewri Fort
 Shaniwar Wada
 Shirgaon Fort
 Shivgad
 Shivneri
 Shrivardhan Fort
 Siddhagad
 Sindhudurg Fort
 Sinhagad
 Sion Hillock Fort
 Sitabuldi Fort
 Solapur fort
 Sondai fort
 Songir
 Songiri
 Sudhagad
 Sumargad
 Surgad
 Suvarnadurg
 Talagad
 Tandulwadi fort
 Tailbaila fort
 Takmak fort
 Tankai fort
 Tarapur fort
 Terekhol Fort
 Thalner
 Tikona
 Tipagad (Gadchiroli)
 Tringalwadi
 Trymbakgad
 Torna Fort
 Tung Fort
 Tungi fort
 Udgir Fort
 Underi
 Vaghera Fort
 Vairagad Fort
 Vairatgad Fort
 Vajragad
 Vandan Fort (Satara)
 Vardhangad Fort
 Varugad
 Vasai Fort/Bassein Fort
 Vasantgad
 Vasota Fort/ Vyaghragad
 Vijaydurg Fort
 Vijaygad Fort
 Vikatgad
 Visapur Fort
 Vishalgad/Khelna Fort
 Worli Fort
 Yashwantgad Fort
 Yeshwantgad
 Yeda Fort

Manipur 

 Bihu Loukon
 Kangla fort

Odisha 
 Barabati fort, Cuttack
 Chudanga Gada, Bhubaneswar
 Potagarh Fort, Ganjam
 Raibania fort, Balasore
 Sisupalgarh, Bhubaneswar

Puducherry 
 French Fort Louis

Punjab 

 Gobindgarh Fort
 Bajwara Fort
 Qila Mubarak (also known as Bhatinda Fort)
 Keshgarh Fort
 Shahpurkandi Fort
 Lodhi Fort
 Manauli Fort
 Phillaur Fort
 Payal Fort
 Mani Majra
 Burail Fort
 Bahadurgarh Fort
 Phul Fort (Residence of Phulkian Royal Family)
 Bahadurgarh Fort
 Sheesh Mahal of Patiala
 Nabha Fort of Nabha
 Qila Mubarak, Patiala
 Jiundan Fort (Residence of Raghu of Phul Royal Family)

Rajasthan 

 Abheda Mahal Fort, Kota
 Khatoli fort, Kota
 Kunadi Fort 
 Palaytha Fort
 City Palace, Jaipur
 Hawa Mahal, Jaipur
 Jal Mahal, Jaipur
( Jag Mandir, Kota
Umaid Bhawan Palace, Jodhpur
Jaswant Thada, Jodhpur
Sardar Samand Place, Jodhpur
Fort Khejarla, Jodhpur
Mandore fort, Jodhpur
Chanva fort, Luni
Devgarh Fort, Sikar
Sikar Garh Fort, Sikar
Raghunath garh fort 
Raja Raisal Lamiya fort, Sikar
Danta fort, Sikar
Bikaner fort, Bikaner
Khaba fort
Kalaa fort, Alwar
Dadhikar fort
Rajgarh fort, Alwar
 Achalgarh Fort
 Ajabgarah Fort
 Alwar fort
 Alwar City Palace
 Amer Fort
 Baansi Fort
 Badalgarh Fort, 
 Baansur Fort
 Bhadrajun Fort
 Bhainsrorgarh
 Bhangarh Fort
 Bhatner fort
 Bijai Garh
 Chittor Fort
 Chomu palace
 Deeg Palace
 Gagron Fort
 Gugor Fort, Baran 
 Hindaun Fort
 Jaigarh Fort
 Jaisalmer Fort
 Jalore Fort
 Jhalawar Fort (Garh Palace)
 Junagarh Fort
 Kankwadi
 Kesroli hill fort
 Khandar Fort
 Khetri Mahal, Jhunjhunu
 Kalla Fort, Alwar
 Kotah Fort
 Kuchaman Fort
 Kumbhalgarh fort, Kumbhalgarh
 Khimsar Fort
 Khejarla Fort, Khejarla
 Khandar Fort
 Kishangarh Fort
 Kelwara Fort, Baran
 Laxmangarh Fort
 Lohagarh Fort
 Madhogarh Fort
 Mandholi Fort
 Mehrangarh Fort
 Mukundgarh Fort, Mukundgarh
 Mundru fort
 Nagaur Fort
 Nua Fort, 
 Nahargarh Fort
 Neemrana
 Patan Fort
 Pagara Fort, Bundi
 Phalodi Fort
 Ranthambore Fort
 Roopangarh Fort
 Siwana fort
 Shergarh Fort, Dholpur
 Shahbad Fort, Baran
 Shergarh Fort, Baran
 Taragarh Fort, Ajmer
 Taragarh Fort, Bundi
 Tijara Fort
 Timan Garh
City Palace, Udaipur
Bijay Niwas palace, Ajmer (now a heritage hotel)
Kishangarh fort, Ajmer
Phool mahal palace, Ajmer
Mokham Vilas, Ajmer
Adhai Din Ka Jhonpra, Ajmer
Rambag Palace, Jaipur (now a heritage hotel)
Devigarh, Udaipur (now a heritage hotel)
Ranbanka Palace, Jodhpur (now a heritage hotel)
Ratan Vilas palace, Jodhpur
Ajit Bhawan palace (now a heritage hotel), Jodhpur
Monsoon Palace Sajjangarh fort, Udaipur
Jag Mandir island palace, Udaipur
Bagore-ki-Haveli, Udaipur
Lake Palace, Udaipur
Bujra fort (now a heritage hotel), Udaipur
Fateh prakash palace, Udaipur
Akbari Fort & Museum, Ajmer
Masuda Fort
Desuri Fort
Ghanerao Fort (now a heritage hotel)
Malkot Fort, Merta
Sardargarh Fort
Deogarh Fort (now a heritage hotel)
Gogunda Fort (now a heritage hotel)
Devigarh Fort, Delwara (now a heritage hotel)
Ekling Garh, Udaipur
Chanod Garh (now a heritage hotel) 
Sojat Fort
Auwa
Dhamli
Ras
Lambiya
Bar
Kurki
Khinwara
Bijapur
Zorawargarh Fort, Jhunjhnu

Sikkim 

 Budang Gaari Fort

Tamil Nadu 

 Vellore Fort
 Alamparai Fort
 Anchettidurgam
 Aranthangi Fort
 Attur Fort
 Dindigul Fort
 Droog Fort, Coonoor
 Erode Fort
 Fort Dansborg
 Fort Geldria
 Fort St. David
 Fort St George
 Fort Vijf Sinnen
 Gingee Fort
 Kenilworth Fort (Hosur)
 Krishnagiri Fort
 Manora Fort
 Namakkal Fort
 Padmanabhapuram Fort
 Rajagiri Fort
 Ranjankudi Fort
 Sadras
 Sankagiri Fort
 Tangrakottai
 Thirumayam Fort
 Tiruchirapalli Rock Fort
 Tiruchirappalli Fort
 Udayagiri Fort
 Vattakottai Fort

Telangana 

 Bhongir Fort
 Devarakonda Fort
 Elgandal Fort
 Gandhari khilla
 Golconda Fort
 Khammam Fort
 Medak Fort
 Nagunur Fort
 Nizamabad Fort
 Rachakonda Fort
 Ramagiri Fort
 Warangal Fort
 Asmangadh Fort
 Gadwal Fort
 Jagtial fort
 Shyamgad Fort
 Tejas Fort
 Trimulgherry Fort

Uttar Pradesh 

 Awagrah Fort, Etah
 Agori Fort SONEBHADRA
 SODHARIGARH FORT SONEBHADRA
 Agra Fort
 Aligarh Fort
 Allahabad Fort
 Bateshwar Fort, Agra
 Baah Fort, Agra
 Badaaun Fort
 Bhareh Fort
 Bijli Passi Fort
 Chapar Ghata Fort
 Chunar Fort
 Fatehgarh Fort
 Fatehpur Sikri
 Hathras Fort
 Hatkant Fort, Agra
 Jhansi Fort
 Kalinjar Fort
 Kuchesar Fort
 Kotarma Fort
 Kachora Fort
 Naugaanv Fort
 Pinahat Fort, Pinahat
 Ramnagar Fort
 Raja Sumer Singh Fort, Etawah
 Ruhya Fort
 Senapati fortress
 Unchagaon fort
 Vijaygarh Fort SONEBHADRA
 Amethi Fort
 Jaunpur Fort
 Kaushambi fort

Uttarakhand 
 Banasur Ka Kila, Champawat 
 Chandpur Fort, Chandpur Garhi
 Chaukhutia Fort, Chaukhutia
 Dewalgarh Fort, Dewalgarh 
 Khagmara Fort
 Lalmandi Fort
 Malla Palace Fort
 Pithoragarh Fort, Pithoragarh

West Bengal 
 Buxa Fort
 Fort William
 Kurumbera Fort
 Fort Mornington

See also 
 Forts in India

References 

 
Forts in India
India
 
India
Forts